Koodali Higher Secondary School is situated in Koodali, Kannur district, Kerala, India, about 15 km south of Kannur town. More than 3000 students study in the school, from standard 5 through to standard 12.

The school was first established in 1946. The school was set up by Kunhaman Gurukkal, who gave the school to his student and the then Karanavar of Koodali Tarawad, Mr K T Kunhikrishnan Nambiar. Many great scholars studied and were taught in this school including the famous Malayali poet P.Kunhiraman nair.

This school received the "Best school in Kerala" award in 1982.

References

Schools in Kannur district
Educational institutions established in 1946
1946 establishments in India
High schools and secondary schools in Kerala